Zhang Jiaqi may refer to:
 Zhang Jiaqi (footballer)
 Zhang Jiaqi (diver)